The communauté urbaine Caen la Mer is the communauté urbaine, an intercommunal structure, centred on the city of Caen. It is located in the Calvados department, in the Normandy region, northwestern France. It was created in January 2017, replacing the previous Communauté d'agglomération Caen la Mer and two communautés de communes. Its area is 362.9 km2. Its population was 268,470 in 2018, of which 105,512 in Caen proper.

History
The communauté urbaine had its origins in the creation in 1990 of a District of Greater Caen (DGC) which consisted of 18 communes.

Since then the grouping transformed itself in 2002 into an Agglomeration called the Communauté d'agglomération du Grand Caen. Since 2004 it has been called the communauté d'agglomération Caen la mer.

The community welcomed ten more member communes on 1 January 2003 and Sannerville on 1 January 2004.

From 1 January 2013, a further six communes were accepted into the agglomeration: three communes from the former Communauté de communes des Rives de l'Odonn (which consisted of Tourville-sur-Odon, Verson, and Mouen) and Colleville-Montgomery, Ouistreham, and Saint-André-sur-Orne. This regrouping created an agglomeration of 236,167 inhabitants. In January 2017 the agglomeration community merged with the former commune communities of Entre Thue et Mue and Plaine Sud de Caen, and became an urban community.

The agglomeration staff numbered 650 workers in 2009, with an annual budget of €245 million, of which €95.9 million were investments.

Presidents of Caen la Mer
 23 November 1990 - 9 April 2001 : Jean-Marie Girault (UDF), Mayor of Caen
 10 April 2001 - 17 April 2008 : Luc Duncombe (UDF-NC), Deputy Mayor of Caen
 18 April 2008 - 25 April 2014 : Philippe Duron (PS), Mayor of Caen
 25 April 2014 - present : Joël Bruneau (The Republicans), Mayor of Caen

Member communes
The communauté urbaine Caen la Mer consists of the following 48 communes:

 Authie
 Bénouville
 Biéville-Beuville
 Blainville-sur-Orne
 Bourguébus
 Bretteville-sur-Odon
 Caen
 Cairon
 Cambes-en-Plaine
 Carpiquet
 Le Castelet
 Castine-en-Plaine
 Colleville-Montgomery
 Colombelles
 Cormelles-le-Royal
 Cuverville
 Démouville
 Épron
 Éterville
 Fleury-sur-Orne
 Giberville
 Grentheville
 Hermanville-sur-Mer
 Hérouville-Saint-Clair
 Ifs
 Le Fresne-Camilly
 Lion-sur-Mer
 Louvigny
 Mathieu
 Mondeville
 Mouen
 Ouistreham
 Périers-sur-le-Dan
 Rosel
 Rots
 Saint-André-sur-Orne
 Saint-Aubin-d'Arquenay
 Saint-Contest
 Saint-Germain-la-Blanche-Herbe
 Saint-Manvieu-Norrey
 Sannerville
 Soliers
 Thaon
 Thue et Mue
 Tourville-sur-Odon
 Troarn
 Verson
 Villons-les-Buissons

Member communes before 2017
As of 2016 the Communauté d'agglomération Caen la Mer included 35 communes. Of these 35 communes, 17 were also part of the urban unit of Caen. Four communes of the urban unit of Caen (Baron-sur-Odon, Fontaine-Étoupefour, Mondrainville and Rots) were not part of the communauté d'agglomération.

The Commune members send a total of 139 delegates to the communitary council

Skills

In accordance with the provisions of the Chevènement Act of 12 July 1999, the responsibilities delegated by the member municipalities of Caen La Mer are divided into three groups:
 Required skills
 Facilitative skills and
 Optional skills

These were determined by the decision of the Community Council of 21 January 2005.

The communauté d'agglomération collects only one tax: a business tax (TP) of 16.06% per annum of the rental value of buildings.

Required Skills

Economic Development
 The creation, development, maintenance and management of areas of industrial, commercial, services, handicrafts, tourism, ports, and airport activities (e.g. Port of Caen, Caen – Carpiquet Airport) in the interests of the community
 Economic development activities recognized as of community interest with the SEM Normandy development and the agency Synergia.

Development of Community spaces
 Planning Territorial Coherence and master plan
 Design and production of ZAC recognized developments in the community interest
 Organisation of Urban Transport. In this context, the community is associated with the General Council of Calvados in a joint union called Viacités, the transport organizing authority of the agglomeration, to whom it delegates its public transport network - the bus and tram network Twisto.

Social balance of housing
 the Local Habitat Program (PLH), signed in 2003, for the annual construction of 1,400 housing units, including 400 for social security, until 2010
 Housing policy in the community interest
 Actions and financial aid for social housing recognized as being in the community interest
 Reserve land for the implementation of the EU's social policy for a balanced habitat
 Actions, by operations of community interest, for housing for the poor
 Improvement of the housing stock of the community

City Policy
Contractual arrangements for urban development, local development and the economic and social integration of community interests (e.g. the City Contract and Urban Contract for social cohesion, the Grand City project and ANRU convention, and the local integration program for the economy (PLIE)
 Local measures in the community interest to prevent delinquency
 Counselling to prevent delinquency and local security measures.

Optional Skills

Roads
 Creation or development and maintenance of roads recognized to be in the community interest
 Creation or development and management of parking areas recognized to be in the community interest.

Sanitation
The community has all the skills of the member communes to monitor, collect and treat wastewater through two stations.
 Protection and enhancement of the environment:
Fight against air pollution
Fight against nuisance noise
Collect and eliminate or use waste from households and other waste through the management of five civic recycling centres.

Facilitative Skills
 Security and control of fire:
Participation in the Fire and Rescue service (SDIS)
 Secretariat of the security committee of the town
 Actions for higher education:
Actions and research on public and private higher education in the community interest.
 Telecommunications network:
Creation of a telecommunications network available for all
 Fight against floods
 Welcoming of vagrants
 Planning and Land Management.
 Culture and Sports: construction, development, maintenance and management of cultural and sports facilities recognized to be in the community interest
the swimming pools at the Aquatic Stadia in the Grace of God, the Chemin-Vert, and the Montmorency districts, and the ice-skating rink.
 Libraries: at Caen, Hérouville, and Ifs;
 Theatres: Champ Exquisite at Blainville and Jean-Vilar at Ifs;
 Cinemas: Le Lux and Le Café des images
 Conservatory and the musical season of the Caen Orchestra
 School of Fine Arts and Media of Caen
 Management of Union House
 Suburban parks and rural areas:
development and management of suburban parks in the agglomeration
development of rural areas within the jurisdiction of the communes
 Littoral
maintenance and management of angle parking areas  and municipal government levees.
find means to supervise and monitor places of swimming and water activities, subject to the exercise of police powers by the mayors
monitoring and maintenance of beaches subject to the exercise of police powers by the mayors
 Development and promotional activities in the community interest such as:
Provision to the member communes of means to take Community action (especially in the context of Article L5211-56 of the General Code for Local Authorities)

See also
 Caen Guided Light Transit

References

External links
 Official website

Caen la Mer
Caen
Caen